Klaus Servene (born 1949 in Marburg, Hesse) is a German writer who lives in Hamburg.

Life 
He studied German philology and other subjects at the Johannes Gutenberg University in Mainz and at the Philipps University in Marburg. After working in Hamburg, Westerland and Stendal, he began to write literature in 1995. Servene is author of narratives, novels, poems and theaterplays.

1997 to 2017 he lived in Mannheim.

After he had initiated the Andiamo Verlag in 2000, he worked from 2001 as host of literary events, as co-organizer of various literary competitions and as a publisher. During several years he supported Viennas Edition Exil, some groups and initiatives like Europa Morgen Land

In 2008 he and the city of Mannheim, as well as Sudabeh Mohafez - Lisboa and Berlin, and Dimitré Dinev - Vienna, published the anthology "Crossing Borders." As a result of the "International Short Story Competition 2007 of the city of Mannheim" - Topic: Migration and Europe. 2011, 2012 and 2013 Servene published the europabrevier grenzenlos. 

Since 2015 he worked with the bulgarian actor and assistant director Limeik Topchi, who was known as an assistant director of Hansgünther Heyme.

Works 

Publications
The Lord of the Lemmings (novel), 1997
Cures (novel), 1998
Hothead (novel), Mannheim 1999, 6., new edition 2007, 
Schatilah (novel), Mannheim 2000, 
Sometimes I'm dreaming of Marrakesh (Biographical novel - with the silent monk Canis Dei), Mannheim 2000, 
Deutschland-Tango (poetry and short texts), Mannheim 2001, 
The tragic end of August von Kotzebue (scenes, directed by Sascha Koal), 2002
They came (Selected Prose 1995-2007), Mannheim 2007, 
A short novel of fur (novel), Mannheim 2007, 
Mannheim, Germany (Stories), Achter-Publishers 2010, 
 Flirting with death (stage play, directed by Limeik Topchi, UA Capitol Mannheim), 2016

 Nathan the wise, (Gotthold Ephraim Lessings stage play new inscenation, directed by Limeik Topchi), 2016

Contributions - Choice
Eyesores (story), C .Bertelsmann-Verlag, Munich 2003, 
A house in Bulgaria, (story, in: Wild Birds fly, Achter-Verlag, Acht, 2009), 
What I know (novel, in:. Lifelines, Stockstädter story competition 2009-2010 winning entries, H & T, Stockstadt am Rhein 2010)

Editions - Choice
Hello Taxi (short stories), Norderstedt 2001, 
Taxiaudiobook with music (compact disc, with Peter Tröster), Mannheim 2005, 
Grenzen.überschreiten. (short stories, with Dimitré Dinev and Sudabeh Mohafez), Mannheim 2008,

Awards - Choice 
 2000: The shortlist for the NDL-price for new German-language novels
 2008: 3rd prize German Wings Story Award "Tales of Flying"
 2009: 2nd prize Achter-Verlag, writing contest about freedom
 2009: 1st Prize Erika Mitterer - poetry competition, Vienna, slogan: "Those who think suspect, those who feel know"
 2010: 2nd prize literary contest of the community Stockstadt am Rhein
 2010: Poetry Prize of the City of Hildesheim

External links
 
 
 
 Dem Leben die Stirn bieten – Porträt des Autors 7. April 2010 Mannheimer Morgen
 Porträt Andiamo Verlag, Mannheimer Morgen 20. August 2014
 Klaus Servene Archiv "Mannheimer Morgen"
 Edition Andiamo Wellhöfer Verlag
 Theaterautor für „Unser Theater“, Internationale Freie Gruppe Metropolregion Rhein-Neckar

References

1949 births
Living people
People from Marburg
German poets
Writers from Mannheim
German male poets